Valga Keskstaadion (Central stadium of Valga) is a multi-use stadium in the town of Valga, Estonia.  It is currently used mostly for athletics and football matches. The stadium holds 452 people and was opened in 1956.

Estonia national team matches 
Valga has hosted two Estonia national football team matches, once in 1998 and once in 2003.

Athletics records
Updated in 2018.

Men

Women

References

External links

Valga Staadion - Valga Sport 
Valga Keskstaadion - Sport.ee 

Sports venues completed in 1956
Sports venues built in the Soviet Union
Football venues in Estonia
Athletics (track and field) venues in Estonia
1956 establishments in Estonia
1956 establishments in the Soviet Union
Buildings and structures in Valga County
Valga, Estonia
Sport in Valga, Estonia
Multi-purpose stadiums in Estonia